Zeiraphera fulvomixtana is a species of moth of the family Tortricidae. It is found in Taiwan, Korea and Japan.

The wingspan is 15.5–19 mm.

References

Moths described in 1974
Eucosmini